Raffaele Maiello (born 10 July 1991 in Acerra) is an Italian professional football player who plays as a midfielder for  club Bari.

Club career
He made his Serie A debut for Napoli on 16 May 2010 in a game against Sampdoria when he came on as a substitute in the 86th minute for Luca Cigarini.

On 29 January 2022, he joined Bari in Serie C on loan, with Bari holding an obligation to purchase his rights in case of promotion to Serie B.

Career statistics

Honours
Bari
 Serie C: 2021–22 (Group C)

References

External links
 
 FIGC  

1991 births
Living people
People from Acerra
Footballers from Campania
Italian footballers
Association football midfielders
Serie A players
Serie B players
Serie C players
S.S.C. Napoli players
F.C. Crotone players
Ternana Calcio players
Empoli F.C. players
Frosinone Calcio players
S.S.C. Bari players
Italy youth international footballers